Derecktor Shipyards is an American ship building company located in Mamaroneck, New York and founded in 1947 by Robert E. Derecktor. The company is known for building Cakewalk V, one of the largest yachts ever built in the United States. Derecktor currently operates two facilities, one in Mamaroneck, New York, which is focused upon the construction and repair of custom yachts and small commercial vessels, the other in Dania Beach, Florida, which is dedicated to the maintenance, repair and refitting of mega-yachts up to 200’ in length and building a third one in Fort Pierce, Florida, which could be operating in autumn 2020, It will be the first shipyard in the United States to specifically handle sailing and motor yachts more than 200' in length to handle the maintenance and refits. 

According to sources, Bob “Old Man” Derecktor is remembered by some for his tough rhetoric and direct leadership, the most notable example of which occurred at a Company Christmas party circa 1970 in which he separated all Production employees to one side of the room and all non-production employees to the other. After separating the groups he remarked “all you non-Production people need to understand one thing: you are here to support the people on the other side of the room, and if you can’t understand that, than there is the door.”

History

The company was founded in Mamaroneck, New York in 1947 by Robert E. Derecktor. The company started as a yacht builder, although it had built many commercial vessels. Derecktor Shipyards occupies the same building on Boston Post Road, with the a few neighboring buildings being bought due to business expansion.

Notable ships built

The following is the list of notable ships built by Derecktor Shipyards.

Hybrid Series
Derecktor Shipyards has built three 65-ft aluminum catamarans powered by hybrid BAE Systems HybriDrive motors. The first was a research vessel for the Maritime Aquarium at Norwalk named Spirit of the Sound, completed in September 2014. The CUNY I, launched in May 2017, is used by Brooklyn College for research in the Jamaica Bay area. The Captain Ben Moore, launched in April 2019, is owned by Harbor Harvest and carries fresh food and other small cargo between Norwalk, CT and Huntington, NY.

See also
 List of shipbuilders and shipyards in the United States

References

Further reading

External links
 
 Ships built by Derecktor Shipyards

Water transportation in New York (state)
American boat builders
Shipbuilding companies of New York (state)
Yacht building companies
Shipyards of New York (state)
American companies established in 1947
Manufacturing companies established in 1947